Knipowitschia panizzae, the Adriatic dwarf goby, is a species of goby native to the coasts of the Adriatic and Ionian Seas where it has been recorded in Italy, Slovenia and Croatia with records from Greece needing to be confirmed.  It prefers fresh and brackish waters with plentiful vegetation.  This species can reach a length of  TL. It is not known who the specific name honours but it is thought likely to be the Italian anatomist Bartolomeo Panizza (1785-1867), who studied the post-reproductive mortality of male sea lampreys.

References

Adriatic dwarf goby
Fish of the Adriatic Sea
Adriatic dwarf goby
Taxonomy articles created by Polbot